The Midlands region of South Carolina is the middle area of the state. The region's main center is Columbia, the state's capital. The Midlands is so named because it is halfway point between the Upstate and the Lowcountry. The main area code is 803.

The area has become a major business center in the state, for its growing production of paper products, textile, medical supplies and steel. It is also a center for farming and medical care. The area is also involved in attractions and tourism, featuring shopping, fishing and amusement.

Counties
The Midlands area of South Carolina includes at least these eight counties: 

Calhoun 
Fairfield
Kershaw 
Lexington
Orangeburg
Richland 
Saluda 
Sumter

Usually included
Lee County
Clarendon County
Newberry County
Aiken County

This region is largely coextensive with the Columbia metropolitan area (which includes Newberry and Orangeburg counties) but . 

The middle portion of Orangeburg County is located in the Midlands, while the western part is located in the Central Savannah River Area and the eastern part is considered to be located in the Lowcountry. Other than being designated to the Augusta, GA market, Aiken County is also frequently listed as part of the Central Savannah River Area.

Cities

Primary cities
(including county and 2020 census count)
Columbia, Richland and Lexington 136,632
Sumter, Sumter County 42,976
Lexington, Lexington County, 23,568
Orangeburg, Orangeburg County 12,704

Suburban towns and cities over 10,000 in population
(including county and 2020 census bureau population estimates) 
West Columbia Lexington, 17,416
Cayce, Lexington, 13,789
Irmo, Richland and Lexington, 11,569
Newberry, Newberry, 10,691 
Forest Acres Richland, 10,606

Suburbs with less than 10,000 inhabitants
(including county and 2020 census bureau population data)

Arcadia Lakes, Richland, 865
Batesburg-Leesville, Lexington, 5,270
Blythewood, Richland, 4,772
Camden, Kershaw, 7,788
Chapin, Lexington, 1,809
Eastover, Richland, 614
Elgin, Kershaw, 1,634
Gaston, Lexington, 1,608
Gilbert, Lexington, 571
Little Mountain, Newberry, 249

North, Orangeburg, 696
Pelion, Lexington, 631
Pine Ridge, Lexington, 2,167
Prosperity, Newberry, 1,178
Ridgeway, Fairfield, 266
Saluda, Saluda, 3,122
Silverstreet, Newberry, 164
St. Matthews, Calhoun, 1,841
Springdale, Lexington, 2,744
Swansea, Lexington, 722
South Congaree, Lexington, 2,377
Winnsboro, Fairfield, 3,215

Unincorporated communities
(2020 Census Figures)
Dentsville, Richland, 14,431
Hopkins, Richland, 13,025 (2010 data)
Lugoff, Kershaw, 9,990
Red Bank, Lexington, 10,924 	
Seven Oaks, Lexington, 14,652
St. Andrews, Richland, 20,675
Woodfield, Richland, 9,199

Higher education

Allen University- Columbia
Benedict College- Columbia
Central Carolina Technical College- Sumter
Claflin University- Orangeburg
Columbia College- Columbia
Columbia International University- Columbia

Midlands Technical College- Columbia
Newberry College- Newberry
Morris College- Sumter
Orangeburg-Calhoun Technical College- Orangeburg
South Carolina State University- Orangeburg
University of South Carolina- Columbia
University of South Carolina Sumter- Sumter
Webster University

Media
The region is served by four commercial television stations, WLTX CBS 19, WOLO ABC 25, WACH FOX 57, and WIS 10. 

The state's second largest newspaper, The State, is published here.

Major highways
 Interstate 20
 Interstate 77
 Interstate 95
 Interstate 26
 Interstate 126
 US 321
 US 21
 US Route 1
 US 76
 US 176
 US 178
 US 378
 US 15
 US 301
 US 601
 US 521
 SC 277
 SC 12
 SC 34
 SC 261

References 

Regions of South Carolina